9X Media is the largest Indian music broadcaster operating 4 music television channels and a Bollywood news portal – www.spotboye.com. The four music channels are 9XM (Latest Bollywood), 9X Jalwa (Evergreen Hindi), 9X Jhakaas (Marathi) and 9X Tashan (Punjabi).

History
The company was founded by Indrani Mukerjea in 2007 through two companies, INX Media Pvt Ltd and INX News Pvt Ltd.

In March 2009, chairman & Chief Strategy Officer (CSO) Peter Mukerjea and founder & CEO Indrani Mukerjea left their management roles at INX Media.

In August 2010, INX Media renamed itself 9X Media as part of a restructuring process. It was planned to be acquired by Zee Entertainment Enterprises in October 2017 for the cost of  160 crore, however the plan fell through in March 2018.

In June 2020, the company shut down its English music network 9XO.

Current stations
9XM : is the flagship channel of 9X Media. Since its launch in 2007, 9XM has been a prominent Bollywood music channel. 9XM airs the latest Bollywood songs interspersed with rib-tickling animation. Its popular animation characters include Bade Chote, Bheegi Billi and Betel Nuts. Bade Chote of Bakwaas Bandh Kar fame entertain viewers with their jokes and funny messages.
9X Jalwa : IT airs Forever Young Bollywood music songs. The Channel also features Bollywood movie trivia through a series of short format shows and vignettes.
9X Tashan: is the Punjabi Music Channel and a category leader since its launch in 2011. 9X Tashan, is targeted at free-spirited Punjabi viewers who take pride in everything related to Punjab.
9X Jhakaas: is First Marathi Music Channel. Targeted at the confident and go-getter Marathi Music lovers, 9X Jhakaas airs Marathi film & non-film songs.

Former stations
9X A general entertainment channel bought by ZEE and later shut down.
9XO: The company's contemporary English & International music channel. It ceased broadcasting on 1 June 2020.

Upcoming Stations 
9x Malayalam

9x Tami

9x Nepali

9x Chinese

News Portal 

SpotboyE : A Bollywood News portal. The website celebrates Bollywood and is the destination for news, features and stories of Bollywood movies, stars and people associated with Bollywood.

Controversies

References

 
Companies based in Mumbai
Television networks in India
Indian companies established in 2007
2007 establishments in Maharashtra
Mass media companies established in 2007